Marco Bortolami (born 12 June 1980) is a rugby union coach and retired Italian international player, whose career includes experience playing in the national top-level Italian (Petrarca Padova), French (RC Narbonne), and English (Gloucester Rugby) championships, before joining the then recently-born Pro14 (with Aironi Rugby and then Zebre). Praised for his leadership skills, he captained all the teams he played for at professional level. At international level, he also captained the Italian side since 2002 till the 2007 Rugby World Cup, before being replaced in the permanent role by Sergio Parisse. He currently serves as head coach for Benetton Rugby in the United Rugby Championship.

Club career
Bortolami began his playing career with the team of his native Padua, making his debut as a second row aged only 18.

After a two-year spell with RC Narbonne in the French Top14, in the summer of 2006 he joined English Premiership side Gloucester Rugby when he was considered by many to be one of the best players in the world around the time, being selected into the starting team for their first game of the season and immediately taking the role of captain. At Gloucester he made up a formidable partnership with Alex Brown and shared captaincy with Peter Buxton. Due to injuries and his World Cup commitments, the 2007–08 season ended up not being as consistent in performance and he lost the Italian captaincy to Italian No. 8 Sergio Parisse, but continued to put in powerful performances for Gloucester. His outstanding leadership qualities meant he retained captaincy. He made 23 appearances for Gloucester in 2008–09.
In 2010 he returned to Italy signing for the new Aironi team which started to compete in the Celtic League from the 2010–11 season. After Aironi folded due to financial problems, Bortolami signed for the new franchise Zebre in the Pro12 for the 2012/13 season.
On 7 May 2016, Bortolami announced his retirement from professional rugby with immediate effect.

International career
Bortolami was made captain of Italy's Under-21 side, before making his international debut at elite level against Namibia in June, 2001, when he was just 20. At the age of 22, Bortolami was made Italy's youngest ever captain by then coach John Kirwan.
In his first-ever World Cup start, against Tonga, he suffered an injury and missed the decisive group-stage match against Wales, which saw the Azzurri eliminated from the competition.
After impressing in the 2004 Six Nations Championship, he was once awarded the full captaincy for the 2005 Summer tour of Japan by coach Pierre Berbizier. After this tour he joined French club Narbonne.
In the 2007 Six Nations Championship, Bortolami led Italy to their first away win in the competition against Scotland at Murrayfield, which was also the first time Italy have won more than one game in a single Six Nations Championship. At the 2007 Rugby World Cup, he led the Italian team to a decisive final group-stage match against Scotland, again missing access to the knock-out stage.
With the 2007 Six Nations Championship, under new coach Nick Mallett, Bortolami was replaced as Italian skipper by Sergio Parisse.
Bortolami suffered an injury against Australia in June 2012, but in May 2013 it was announced that he would be returning to the international stage.

Coaching career
Bortolami left Zebre at the end of the Celtic League 2015/16 season, and became Assistant Coach at Benetton Treviso from the start of the 2016/17 season.

Other information
In an interview in 2006, Bortolami stated that he wishes to become a mechanic for Ferrari after he retires from professional rugby, using the mechanical skills that he picked up in college. Shortly after the interview had taken place, he received a letter from Ferrari offering him a position as soon as he completed his rugby career. Something must be changed since then because now Bortolami moved into coaching the forwards for Benetton Treviso in Italy, after his last match on 7 May 2016.

Although he has never been considered a violent player, his rough and direct playing style and his sometimes conflictual approach with the referees have led Bortolami to collect seven yellow cards in his long international career, surpassed in this unenviable ranking only by the Australian Michael Hooper and the Georgian Viktor Kolelishvili, both with eight.

References

External links
Zebre Profile 
Gloucester Profile

1980 births
Italian rugby union coaches
Italian rugby union players
Living people
Sportspeople from Padua
Rugby union locks
Aironi players
Gloucester Rugby players
Italy international rugby union players
Petrarca Rugby players
Zebre Parma players
Italian expatriate rugby union players
Italian expatriate sportspeople in France
Italian expatriate sportspeople in England
Expatriate rugby union players in France
Expatriate rugby union players in England